Alexander Lindqvist (born 12 February 1991) is a Swedish basketball player and a member of the Swedish national team. He won the Swedish championship in 2013 and 2019 as a member of the Södertälje Kings.

Playing career
In October 2019, Lindqvist signed with LEB Oro club BTTB Mallorca-Palma.

In September 2020, Lindqvist signed with Úrvalsdeild karla club Stjarnan. On 27 September, he won the Icelandic Super Cup after Stjarnan defeated Grindavík in the Cup final.

National team career
Lindqvist debuted with the Swedish national team in 2012. In 2019, he played his 50th game for the national team.

References

External links
Profile at proballers.com
Profile at Eurobasket.com
Swedish League and National team profile at basket.se

1991 births
Living people
Small forwards
Stjarnan men's basketball players
Swedish men's basketball players
Södertälje Kings players
Solna Vikings players
Úrvalsdeild karla (basketball) players